Stevo Nikolić  (Serbian Cyrillic: Cтeвo Николић; born 4 December 1984) is a Bosnian professional footballer who plays for Žarkovo.

Club career
Born in Bosanski Šamac, SR Bosnia and Herzegovina, he started playing with local side Borac Šamac, and in 1999, with 15 years, he moved to Belgrade to play in the youth team of FK Obilić, the surprising 1998 FR Yugoslavia champions. With them, he was the national youth champion in Serbia, and from 2002 to 2004 played with the first team.

In 2004, he returned to Bosnia and signed with Cup holders FK Modriča, and played there until 2008 when he moved to Romanian club Oțelul Galați. He became a free agent in the summer of 2010, after a two-year spell at Otelul, he signed with Borac Banja Luka.  After one season in Bosnia in which Borac won the championship, he moved to Hungary by signing with Debreceni VSC.

International career
Just like namesake Staniša, Stevo Nikolić made his debut for Bosnia and Herzegovina in a January 2008 friendly match away against Japan and has earned a total of 2 caps, scoring 1 goal. His second and final international was a June 2008 friendly against Azerbaijan.

International goals
''Scores and results table. Bosnia and Herzegovina's goal tally first:

Honours

Player
Modriča 
Bosnian Premier League: 2007–08
Republika Srpska Cup: 2006–07 

Borac Banja Luka
Bosnian Premier League: 2010–11
Republika Srpska Cup: 2010–11

Debreceni 
Hungarian First League: 2011–12
Hungarian Cup: 2011–12

Zrinjski Mostar 
Bosnian Premier League: 2013–14, 2015–16

Individual
Performance 
Bosnian Premier League Top Goalscorer: 2006–07 (19 goals)

References

External links

1984 births
Living people
People from Šamac, Bosnia and Herzegovina
Serbs of Bosnia and Herzegovina
Association football forwards
Association football midfielders
Bosnia and Herzegovina footballers
Bosnia and Herzegovina international footballers

FK Obilić players
FK Modriča players
ASC Oțelul Galați players
FK Borac Banja Luka players
Debreceni VSC players
FC Spartak Trnava players
HŠK Zrinjski Mostar players
FK Željezničar Sarajevo players
NK Čelik Zenica players
OFK Žarkovo players
FK Brodarac players
FK Jedinstvo Surčin players
First League of Serbia and Montenegro players
Premier League of Bosnia and Herzegovina players
Liga I players
Nemzeti Bajnokság I players
Slovak Super Liga players
Serbian First League players
Bosnia and Herzegovina expatriate footballers
Expatriate footballers in Serbia and Montenegro
Bosnia and Herzegovina expatriate sportspeople in Serbia and Montenegro
Expatriate footballers in Romania
Bosnia and Herzegovina expatriate sportspeople in Romania
Expatriate footballers in Hungary
Bosnia and Herzegovina expatriate sportspeople in Hungary
Expatriate footballers in Slovakia
Bosnia and Herzegovina expatriate sportspeople in Slovakia
Expatriate footballers in Serbia
Bosnia and Herzegovina expatriate sportspeople in Serbia